Tigrillos Dorados MRCI was a football club that plays in the Tercera División de México. The club was based in Oaxaca, Oaxaca, Mexico.

History
The club was founded on 14 March 2008, as an indoor soccer club and soon joined a local soccer league in Oaxaca. In 2009 the club joined the Tercera División de México. The club also plays basketball and baseball, both in male and female local leagues. In 2018, Tigrillos Dorados merged with Chapulineros de Oaxaca, in this way, the team disappeared.

See also
Football in Mexico

References

External links
Official site

Football clubs in Oaxaca
Association football clubs established in 2008
2008 establishments in Mexico